Back Home may refer to:

Literature 
 Back Home (novel), a 1984 novel by Michelle Magorian, twice adapted for television
Back Home (Pinkney book), a children's picture book by Gloria Jean Pinkney, illustrated by Jerry Pinkney

Music

Albums 
 Back Home (Bearfoot Bluegrass album), 2003
 Back Home (Caedmon's Call album), 2003
 Back Home (Chuck Berry album), 1970
 Back Home (Eric Clapton album), 2005
 Back Home (Merle Travis album), 1957
 Back Home (Phineas Newborn Jr. album), recorded 1976, released 1985
 Back Home (Trey Songz album), 2020
 Back Home (Warne Marsh album), 1986
 Back Home (Westlife album), 2007
 Back Home Tour, tour by Westlife in support of the album

Songs 
 "Back Home" (1970 song), a song by the 1970 England World Cup football squad
 "Back Home" (Golden Earring song), 1970
 "Back Home", by Andy Grammer from Magazines or Novels
 "Back Home", by The Beach Boys from 15 Big Ones
 "Back Home", by the Bee Gees from 2 Years On
 "Back Home", by Booker T. & the M.G.'s from Melting Pot
 "Back Home", by Graham Nash from This Path Tonight
 "Back Home", by Owl City from Mobile Orchestra
 "Back Home", by Reks from The Greatest X

Other uses 
 Back Home, a 1990 film starring Hayley Mills

See also 
 Back Home Again (disambiguation)